Andy Murray was the defending champion, but he chose not to compete this year.

Sergiy Stakhovsky won in the final over Horacio Zeballos 2–6, 7–6(10–8), 7–6(9–7).

Seeds

Draw

Finals

Top half

Bottom half

External links
 Main Draw
 Qualifying Draw

St. Petersburg Open - Singles
St. Petersburg Open
2009 in Russian tennis